Avdey is a rural locality (a selo) in Shishkinskoye Rural Settlement of Chitinsky District, Zabaykalsky Krai, Russia. The population was 179 as of 2010. There are 7 streets.

Geography 
The village is located on the right bank of the Chita River, 46 km north of Chita (the district's administrative centre) by road. Shishkino is the nearest rural locality.

Ethnicity 
The village is inhabited by Buryats, Russians.

References 

Rural localities in Zabaykalsky Krai